Julia Jones is an American actress.

Julia Jones may also refer to:

 Julia Jones-Pugliese (1909–1993), American national champion fencer and coach
 Julia Jones (conductor) (born 1961), English conductor
 Julia Jones (writer) (born 1954), British book publisher and writer
 Julia Jones (dramatist) (1923–2015), British television playwright
 Julia Peyton-Jones (born 1952), British curator

See also
 Julie Jones (disambiguation)